Haybro is an extinct town in Routt County, Colorado, United States. The Geographic Names Information System classifies it as a populated place.

Description
A post office called Haybro was established in 1918, and remained in operation until 1951. The community's name is a contraction of the Hayden brothers, proprietors of a local coal mine.

See also

 List of ghost towns in Colorado

References

External links

Ghost towns in Colorado
Geography of Routt County, Colorado